Megaloremmius (sometimes called the “lion spider”) is a monotypic genus of Malagasy huntsman spiders containing the single species, Megaloremmius leo. It was first described by Eugène Louis Simon in 1903, and is found on Madagascar.

See also
 List of Sparassidae species

References

Monotypic Araneomorphae genera
Sparassidae
Spiders of Madagascar